Alan Wood Jr. (July 6, 1834 – October 31, 1902) was a Republican member of the U.S. House of Representatives from Pennsylvania.

The nephew of John Wood, who also served in Congress, Alan Wood Jr. was born in Philadelphia, Pennsylvania.  He attended private schools and was employed in his father's mill at the Delaware Iron Works, near Wilmington, Delaware.  He moved to Conshohocken, Pennsylvania in 1857, and was engaged in iron manufacturing and banking.

Wood was elected as a Republican to the Forty-fourth Congress in 1874, and served from March 4, 1875 to March 3, 1877. 
He was not a candidate for renomination in 1876.  He resumed his former business activities and also engaged in agricultural pursuits.  He served as president of the Alan Wood Iron & Steel Co.  He died in 1902 in Philadelphia, where he was interred in The Woodlands Cemetery.

See also

Woodmont

Sources

The Political Graveyard

External links

1834 births
1902 deaths
People from Montgomery County, Pennsylvania
Politicians from Philadelphia
People from Wilmington, Delaware
Republican Party members of the United States House of Representatives from Pennsylvania
Burials at The Woodlands Cemetery
19th-century American politicians